Yoo Jae-suk (born on August 14, 1972), is a South Korean comedian, host and television personality currently signed to Antenna.

Television host

Timeline

Film

Television series

Music video appearances

References 

Yoo Jae-suk